Klentnice is a municipality and village in Břeclav District in the South Moravian Region of the Czech Republic. It has about 500 inhabitants.

Geography
It lies in the Pavlov Hills within the Mikulov Highlands. The village is situated on the eastern slope of the hill Stolová hora ( above sea level).

Klentnice is located in the Pálava Protected Landscape Area.

History

Grave findings of the La Tène culture are documents of an early settlement. In the times of Great Moravia, the area was inhabited by Slavs. After the empire fell, the inhabitants were replaced by German colonists. The first written mention of Klentnice is from 1322, when it was part of the Mikulov estate.

As a part of the Mikulov estate, it was owned by the House of Liechtenstein. They contributed to cultural and ethnic enrichment when they invited Jews and Anabaptists. In 1560, the Liechtensteins sold the estate to the Kerecseny family. In 1575, the estate was donated to the Dietrichstein family by Emperor Maximillian II. During their rule in the second half of the 17th century and in the 18th century, the estate prospered and developed.

After the World War I, the multi-ethnic state Austria-Hungary was split up. By the Treaty of Saint-Germain-en-Laye, Klentnice became part of the newly established Czechoslovakia. Following the Munich Agreement, the municipality belonged to the Reichsgau Niederdonau until 1945. After the World War II, the municipality fell back to Czechoslovakia and the German population was expelled. The town was recolonized by ethnic Czechs mainly from Moravian Slovakia.

Demographics

Sights

The Church of Saint George was first mentioned in 1582. The today's structure was built in 1783–1785.

The ruin of the castle Sirotčí hrádek is located above the village. The castle was founded at the turn of 13th and 14th centuries. It was abandoned before 1590 and referred to as completely desolated in 1629.

References

External links

Villages in Břeclav District